Yerbogachen Airport  is an airport located 1 km east of Yerbogachen in the Irkutsk Oblast, Russia.

Airlines and destinations

References

Airports built in the Soviet Union
Airports in Irkutsk Oblast